Season 1877–78 was the third season in which Heart of Midlothian competed at a Scottish national level, entering the Scottish Cup for the third time.

Overview 

Hearts only reached the first round of the Scottish Cup, being defeated by Edinburgh derby rivals Hibs in the first round after a replay.

Later that season, Hibs and Hearts contested the Final of the Edinburgh FA Cup. Hearts eventually won the local competition after a fourth replay, with the decisive match (won 3–2 by Hearts) played over two months after the first attempt. The long running saga established Hibs and Hearts as the predominant clubs in Edinburgh. The Edinburgh derby, as it would become known, is the second oldest regularly played derby match, after the Nottingham derby between Notts County and Nottingham Forest.

Results

Scottish cup

Edinburgh FA Cup

See also
List of Heart of Midlothian F.C. seasons

References 

 Statistical Record 77-78

External links 
 Official Club website

Heart of Midlothian F.C. seasons
Hea